Galactic Center may refer to

Galactic Center, the rotational center of the Milky Way galaxy
The Galactic Center Saga, a series of books

See also
Galactic anticenter
Galactic core (disambiguation)